Antarnaad ("Inner voice") was a 1991 Hindi film made by Shyam Benegal, based on the Swadhyay Movement by Pandurang Shastri Athavale.

Cast
 Shabana Azmi 
 Kulbhushan Kharbanda
 Shobha Khote
 Om Puri
 Girish Karnad
 Dina Pathak
 Pawan Malhotra
 Rupal Patel

References

External links
 

1990s Hindi-language films
1991 films
Films with screenplays by Shama Zaidi
Films directed by Shyam Benegal